Alexandra Wenk (born 7 February 1995) is a German swimmer who competes in the Women's 100 metre butterfly. At the 2012 Summer Olympics, she finished 21st overall in the heats in the Women's 100 metre butterfly and failed to reach the final. At the 2016 Summer Olympics in Rio de Janeiro, she finished in 21st place in the women's 100 m butterfly and did not qualify for the semifinals. She competed in the women's 200 m medley where she finished 11th in the semifinals and did not qualify for the final. She was also a member of the women's  medley relay team which finished 12th in the heats and did not qualify for the final.

Her Romanian-born mother Gabriela was an Olympic swimmer for Romania and European Championships silver medalist.

References

External links
 
 
 
 
 

German female swimmers
German people of Romanian descent
1995 births
Living people
Olympic swimmers of Germany
Swimmers at the 2012 Summer Olympics
Swimmers at the 2016 Summer Olympics
Female butterfly swimmers
European Aquatics Championships medalists in swimming
World Aquatics Championships medalists in swimming